Warmenhoven & Venderbos is a Netherlands-based clothing label founded in 1996 by Sascha Warmenhoven and Babette Venderbos.

Origins
The Netherlands-based label is the partnership of Sascha Warmenhoven and Babette Venderbos. The two met while studying at the Academy of Fine Arts in Rotterdam and connected through their mutual appreciation for fashion design and art. During their studies, the two individually pursued art and fashion in their own ways. A native from the Netherlands but born in Germany, Sascha Warmenhoven went on to work for major sportswear labels after graduation.  During his studies, he managed to garner internships with Walter Van Beirendonck and Dirk Van Saene. Babette Venderbos, also a native from the Netherlands interned with So by Alexander van Slobbe and worked for Maison Martin Margiela. After they maintained their relationship throughout their studies, they decided to work together and launched their first collection in 1996. Even though they have been working together since 1996, they didn't make their name official until 2000. From their creative visions sprouted individualistically abstract pieces of autonomic conceptual fashion and later on a pret-a-porter collection.

Style
The brand designs conceptual fashion pieces that are futuristically minimal. Their clothing caters to the self-confidence of a woman by invoking edgy femininity through avant-garde artistry. With an elegant reverence, their designs cut against the mainstream of fashion. Their experimental creativity produces pieces that have all the elements of an haute couture, pret-a-porter, and fine pieces of art. Their mixture of textures shows with their valiant use of sheer materials contrasted with other common textiles. Black and white remains consistent with many of their collections. The sleekness of the basic colors is finely exaggerated with mild use of vibrant colours. Their sophisticated, fashion-forward European aesthetic shines through as they use a variety of techniques and layers in their clothing. Mixes of flattering cuts, slanted seams, innovative use of fasteners as well as the manipulated gathering and draping fabrics adhere to the autonomous paradigms of the design duo.

Each piece in the brand's collections is an individual development on its own emulating a strong amount of character. Their stylistically detailed collections are released twice a year: one for autumn/winter and another for spring/summer. Maintaining their positions as dedicated artists, their passion for art is not only shown through their designs, but in the way that they are presented. The brand showcases images of their clothing in unique ways. Some of the pieces are exhibited in abstract form, paralleling the designers' philosophies on fashion, art and body. To add even more to their love for high art, the two are often associated with artistic conceptual installation pieces, photography, drawings and costuming.

References

FashionFad in focus Fashionfad fashion and lifestyle magazine Retrieved 2010-06-07

External links
Official Website
KTD Fashion

Dutch fashion designers
High fashion brands
Willem de Kooning Academy alumni
People from Geertruidenberg